Sabatia dodecandra, common names large marsh pink or marsh rose gentian, is a plant in the Gentianaceae family.

Conservation status in the United States
It is listed as a special concern and believed extirpated in Connecticut.

References

dodecandra
Flora of the Eastern United States
Endemic flora of the United States
Endangered flora of the United States
Flora without expected TNC conservation status